Cottonwood Lake is a lake in Grant County and Stevens counties, in the U.S. state of Minnesota.

Cottonwood Lake was named for the cottonwood trees near its banks.

See also
List of lakes in Minnesota

References

Lakes of Minnesota
Lakes of Stevens County, Minnesota
Lakes of Grant County, Minnesota